Michael Damian Weir (born April 26, 1962) is an American actor, recording artist, and producer, best known for his role as Danny Romalotti on the soap opera The Young and the Restless, which he played from 1980 to 1998 and again in 2002-2004, 2008, 2012-2013, and again in 2022.

Career
Michael began his music career as a member of his family band, The Weirz, who released two self-titled albums, one in 1975 and one in 1979. After a 1981 appearance on American Bandstand in support of his debut single, a cover of the Eric Carmen tune "She Did It”, Damian was offered the part of struggling singer, Danny Romalotti, on the daytime television series The Young and the Restless.

Michael appeared in three episodes of the popular television series The Facts of Life (in 1985 - Season 6 episodes 19-20 as well as 1986 in the nineteenth episode of Season 7) playing Flyman, the love interest of Jo Polniaczek (Nancy McKeon).

After twelve years with The Young and the Restless, Damian landed the starring role in the Broadway production of Andrew Lloyd Webber and Tim Rice's musical, Joseph and the Amazing Technicolor Dreamcoat. With Damian cast as Joseph, the production set a single day box-office record as well as a historical record for the highest weekly gross for a Broadway revival at the Minskoff Theatre. Joseph and the Amazing Technicolor Dreamcoat had 231 performances at the Minskoff Theatre from November 10, 1993, to May 29, 1994. The cast album earned a Grammy Award nomination in the Best Musical Show Album category.

Damian has released five albums with three top 40 hits, including his number-one cover of the David Essex song "Rock On" (from the Dream a Little Dream soundtrack), which was certified gold in 1989. He also won a BMI Song-writing Award for his hit single "Was It Nothing at All.” He made his feature film directorial debut with an indie comedy, Hot Tamale, which he co-wrote with his wife Janeen, who is the daughter of actor James Best. Following in the family film genre, he directed the films Moondance Alexander, Flicka 2, Marley & Me: The Puppy Years, Flicka: Country Pride, and A Princess for Christmas. In 2012, he directed and co-wrote, again with his wife, the 90-minute romantic comedy The Sweeter Side of Life, co-starring his father-in-law veteran actor James Best in his last film role. The film premiered on the Hallmark Channel on January 19, 2013.

Discography
Studio albums

Singles

Duet Performance
"Don't Make Me Wait" by Pınar Aylin (feat. Michael Damian)
Album Bekletme-Don't Make Me Wait
Release Country Turkey
Composers Feyyaz Kuruş & Aşkın Tuna
Release Year 1998

Theatre
 1971–1973: Ventura County Youth Experimental Theatre 
 1993–1994: Joseph and the Amazing Technicolor Dreamcoat as Joseph

References

External links

1962 births
Living people
20th-century American male actors
21st-century American male actors
Male actors from San Diego
American male film actors
American film directors
Film producers from California
American male musical theatre actors
American male screenwriters
American male soap opera actors
American male television actors
Musicians from San Diego
Singers from California
Columbia Records artists
CBS Records artists
A&M Records artists
Zomba Group of Companies artists
Screenwriters from California
20th-century American singers
20th-century American male singers
21st-century American singers
21st-century American male singers
21st-century American screenwriters
21st-century American male writers